Severe Tropical Cyclone Meena was the first of four tropical cyclones to impact the Cook Islands during February 2005.

Meteorological history

During that day, the system moved south-westwards and started to consolidate, before the Fiji Meteorological Service (FMS) classified the system as Tropical Depression 07F. At this stage, the depression was poorly organised with atmospheric convection displaced to the north of the systems low level circulation center, while it was located to the south of a ridge of high pressure in an area of moderate vertical wind shear. Over the next day, the system's organisation significantly improved with the development of a small central dense overcast, while its outflow was enhanced by a cross-equatorial wind flow. During February 3, the systems low level circulation center gradually slipped underneath the central dense overcast, before the FMS reported that the system had become a Category 1 tropical cyclone on the Australian scale and named it Meena.

Effects
Meena was the first of four severe tropical cyclones to impact the Cook Islands during the 2004–05 season.

Samoan Islands
Authorities in the territory closed public schools and advised residents to prepare for heavy showers and possible flooding due to the cyclone. Flights to Manu'a islands were cancelled while delays occurred on flights between Samoa and American Samoa.

Cook Islands
During February 2, the FMS issued strong wind warnings and a tropical cyclone alert for both the Northern and the Southern Cook Islands, as it was thought that the system could produce gale-force winds over the islands within 24 - 48 hours. As a result of the alert being issued, the emergency operations centre was opened, while people were urged to move off the beach to higher ground. During the following day, gale warnings were issued for Suwarrow in the Northern Cooks and for Palmerston in the Southern Cooks.

See also

Cyclone Val – Impacted the Cook Islands during 1991
Cyclone Martin – Impacted the Cook Islands during 1997

References

External links
Damage pictures of Severe Tropical Cyclone Meena from the Cook Islands News

Category 5 South Pacific cyclones
Tropical cyclones in the Cook Islands
Tropical cyclones in American Samoa
2004–05 South Pacific cyclone season
2005 in the Cook Islands
2005 in American Samoa